The stout ctenotus (Ctenotus hebetior)  is a species of skink found in the Northern Territory and Queensland in  Australia.

References

hebetior
Reptiles described in 1978
Taxa named by Glen Milton Storr